"Put Your Hands Up in the Air!" is a song recorded by Belgian dance artist Danzel. It was released in August 2005 as a single and charted in many countries throughout Europe. It uses the vocal hook from the 1998 song "Put Your Hands Up" by Swiss duo The Black & White Brothers.

Track listings
 CD maxi - Belgium
 "Put Your Hands Up in the Air!" - 6:17	
 "Put Your Hands Up in the Air!" (Radio Edit) - 3:31	
 "Put Your Hands Up in the Air! (Extended Mix) - 7:42	
 "Dance Hostess" - 3:06

Charts

Peak positions

References

Songs about music
2005 singles
Danzel songs
2005 songs
Data Records singles